A maritime museum (sometimes nautical museum) is a museum specializing in the display of objects relating to ships and travel on large bodies of water. A subcategory of maritime museums are naval museums, which focus on navies and the military use of the sea.

The great prize of a maritime museum is a historic ship (or a replica) made accessible as a museum ship, but as these are large and require a considerable budget to maintain, many museums preserve smaller or more fragile ships or partial ships within the museum buildings. Most museums exhibit interesting pieces of ships (such as a figurehead or cannon), ship models, and miscellaneous small items associated with ships and shipping, like cutlery, uniforms, and so forth.

Ship modellers often have a close association with maritime museums; not only does the museum have items that help the modeller achieve better accuracy, but the museum provides a display space for models larger than will comfortably fit in a modeller's home, and of the museum is happy to take a ship model as a donation. Museums will also commission models.

There are thousands of maritime museums in the world. Many belong to the International Congress of Maritime Museums, which coordinates members' efforts to acquire, preserve, and display their material. There is a risk that too many maritime museums might dilute the experience for the public, while a poorly managed museum might put other municipalities off from the idea of hosting such a museum.

At  the Historic Dockyard Chatham in Kent, UK can lay claim to being the largest maritime museum in the world, incorporating numerous dockyard buildings, including a 1/4 mile long ropewalk, spinning rooms, covered slips, dry docks, smithery, sail loft, rigging house, mould loft, church, as well as three historic warships, it is the best preserved dockyard from the Age of Sail. However, the UK's National Maritime Museum in Greenwich is also a contender, with many items of great historical significance, such as the actual uniform worn by Horatio Nelson at the Battle of Trafalgar.

A recent activity of maritime museums is to build replicas of ships, since there are few survivors that have not already been restored and put on display. Another is operating a museum harbour, most notably in Germany and the Netherlands but elsewhere too, that offers mooring to privately owned historical vessels, which can be watched but not boarded.

Preservation of ships 
The preservation of ships in museums ensures that ancient and historic vessels are preserved for posterity in optimum conditions and are available for academic study and for public education and interest.

Remains of ancient and historic ships and boats can be seen in museums around the world. Where a ship is in a good state of preservation it can sometimes act as a museum in its own right. Many museum ships, such as HMS Victory are popular tourist attractions. Some ships are too fragile to be exposed outdoors or are incomplete and must be preserved indoors. The remains of the Mary Rose for example are kept in a purpose designed building so that conservation treatment can be applied.

In some cases, archaeologists have discovered traces of ships and boats where there are no extant physical remains to be preserved, such as Sutton Hoo, where museum displays can show what the vessel would have looked like, although the vessel itself no longer exists.

Notable maritime museums

Africa 
 Admiral Nevelskoi Maritime Museum, Admiral Nevelskoi Yacht, Mauritius
 Alexandria Maritime Museum, Alexandria, Egypt
 Musée de la Mer, Gorée, Senegal
 Oceanographic Museum of Salammbô, Carthage, Tunisia
 South African Naval Museum, Simon's Town, South Africa

Asia 

Brunei Darussalam Maritime Museum, Kota Batu, Brunei
Evergreen Maritime Museum, Taipei, Taiwan
 Hoods Tower Naval Museum, Trincomalee, Sri Lanka
 Hong Kong Maritime Museum, Central, Hong Kong, China
 Kure maritime Museum, Kure, Japan
 Kursura Submarine Museum, Visakhapatnam, India
 Kobe Maritime Museum, Kobe, Japan
 Maritime Museum, Macau, China
 Maritime Museum, Malacca, Malaysia
 Maritime Museum, Tranquebar, India
 Maritime Museum of Indonesia, Jakarta, Indonesia
 Maritime Museum of Kuwait, Kuwait City, Kuwait
 Museum of Maritime Science, Tokyo, Japan
 National Maritime Museum, Busan, South Korea
 National Maritime Museum, Galle, Sri Lanka
 Naval Aviation Museum, Vasco da Gama, India
 Pakistan Maritime Museum, Karachi, Pakistan
 Quanzhou Maritime Museum, Quanzhou, Fujian, China
 Sea Culture Museum, Okinawa, Japan
 Tamkang University Maritime Museum, New Taipei, Taiwan
 Visakha Naval Maritime Museum, Visakhapatnam, India
 YM Museum of Marine Exploration Kaohsiung, Kaohsiung, Taiwan

Oceania 

 Australian National Maritime Museum, Sydney, Australia
 Maritime Museum of New Caledonia, Nouméa, New Caledonia
 Maritime Museum of Tasmania, Hobart, Australia
 National Maritime Museum, Auckland, New Zealand
 Queensland Maritime Museum, Brisbane, Queensland, Australia
 Sydney Heritage Fleet, Sydney, Australia
 Torpedo Bay Navy Museum, Auckland, New Zealand
 Western Australian Maritime Museum, Fremantle, Western Australia, Australia

Europe 

 Aalborg Søfarts- og Marinemuseum, Aalborg, Denmark
 Aberdeen Maritime Museum, Aberdeen, Scotland, United Kingdom
 Central Naval Museum, Saint-Petersburg, Russia
 Chatham Historic Dockyard, Chatham, Kent, England, United Kingdom
 Cité de la Mer, Cherbourg-Octeville, France
 Danish Maritime Museum, Kronborg Castle, Helsingør, Denmark
 Dutch Navy Museum, Den Helder, Netherlands
 Estonian Maritime Museum, Tallinn, Estonia
 Fisheries and Maritime Museum, Esbjerg, Denmark
 Forum Marinum, Turku, Finland
 Fries Scheepvaart Museum, Sneek, Netherlands
 Galata Museo del Mare, Genoa, Italy
 German Maritime Museum, Bremerhaven, Germany
 German Naval Museum, Wilhelmshaven, Germany
 Hull Maritime Museum, Kingston upon Hull, England, United Kingdom
 Internationales Maritimes Museum, Hamburg, Germany
 Istanbul Naval Museum, Istanbul, Turkey
Jersey Maritime Museum, Saint Helier, Jersey
 The Frigate Jylland, Ebeltoft, Denmark
 Kiel Maritime Museum, Kiel, Germany
 Lancaster Maritime Museum, Lancaster, England, United Kingdom
 Lowestoft Maritime Museum, Suffolk, England, United Kingdom
 Malta Maritime Museum, Birgu, Malta
 Marinemuseet, Karljohansvern, Horten, Norway
 Marinmuseum, Karlskrona, Sweden
 Maritime Center Vellamo, Kotka, Finland
 Maritime Museum, Stockholm, Sweden
 Maritiman, Gothenburg, Sweden
 Maritime Museum of Barcelona, Barcelona, Spain
 Maritime Museum Ria de Bilbao, Bilbao, Spain
 Maritime Museum Rotterdam, Rotterdam, the Netherlands
 Merseyside Maritime Museum, Liverpool, England, United Kingdom
 Musée national de la Marine, Paris, France
 Musée national de la Marine in Brest, Brest, France
 Musée national de la Marine in Port-Louis, Port-Louis, France
 Musée national de la Marine in Rochefort, Rochefort, France
 Musée national de la Marine in Toulon, Toulon, France
 Musée Mer Marine Bordeaux, Bordeaux, France
 Museo Naval de Madrid, Madrid, Spain
 Museo Storico Navale, Venice, Italy
 Technical Naval Museum, La Spezia, Italy
 Museu de Marinha, Lisbon, Portugal
 Museum of Military History of the Black Sea Fleet, Sevastopol, Ukraine
 Museum of the World Ocean, Kaliningrad, Russia
 Museum of the Sea, Cascais, Portugal
 National Maritime Museum, Amsterdam, Netherlands
 National Maritime Museum, Cornwall, England, United Kingdom
 National Maritime Museum, Gdańsk, Poland
 National Maritime Museum, Greenwich, England, United Kingdom
 National Maritime Museum of Ireland, Dún Laoghaire, Ireland
 National Maritime Museum, Szczecin, Poland
 Naval Museum of the Northern Fleet, Murmansk, Russia
 Northern Maritime Museum, Arkhangelsk, Russia
 Oceanographic Museum of Monaco
 Passage West Maritime Museum, Cork, Ireland
 Rauma Maritime Museum, Rauma, Finland
 Royal Danish Naval Museum, Copenhagen, Denmark
 Schifffahrtsmuseum Flensburg, Flensburg, Germany
 Scottish Maritime Museum, Irvine, Scotland, United Kingdom
 Southampton Maritime Museum, Southampton, England, United Kingdom
 Vasa Museum, Stockholm, Sweden
 Vikin Maritime Museum, Reykjavík, Iceland
 Westfjords Heritage Museum, Ísafjörður, Iceland

North America 
The Council of American Maritime Museums serves as network for museum professionals in North America.

 Battleship USS Iowa Museum, Los Angeles, California, USA
 Bermuda Maritime Museum, Sandys Parish, Bermuda
 Buffalo and Erie County Naval & Military Park, Buffalo, New York, USA
 Calvert Marine Museum, Solomons, Maryland, USA
 Camden Shipyard & Maritime Museum, Camden, New Jersey, USA
 Columbia River Maritime Museum, Astoria, Oregon, USA
 Coral World Ocean Park, St. Thomas, U.S. Virgin Islands
 Dossin Great Lakes Museum, Detroit, Michigan, USA
 Florida Maritime Museum, Cortez, Florida, USA
 Great Lakes Floating Maritime Museum, Duluth, Minnesota, USA
 H. Lee White Marine Museum, Oswego, New York, USA
 Hampton Roads Naval Museum, Norfolk, Virginia, USA
 Herreshoff Marine Museum, Bristol, Rhode Island, USA
 Historic Ships in Baltimore, Baltimore, Maryland, USA
 Independence Seaport Museum, Philadelphia, Pennsylvania, USA
 Intrepid Sea, Air & Space Museum, New York City, USA
 Lake Champlain Maritime Museum, Basin Harbor, Vermont, USA
 Long Island Maritime Museum, Long Island, New York, USA
 Los Angeles Maritime Museum, Los Angeles, California, USA
 Maine Maritime Museum, Bath, Maine, USA
 Mariners' Museum, Newport News, Virginia, USA – National Maritime Museum
 Maritime Heritage Centre, Campbell River, British Columbia, Canada
 Maritime Museum, Belize City, Belize

 Maritime & Seafood Industry Museum, Biloxi, Mississippi, USA
 Maritime Museum of British Columbia, Victoria, British Columbia, Canada
 Maritime Museum of San Diego, San Diego, California, USA
 Maritime Museum of the Atlantic, Halifax, Nova Scotia, Canada
 Maritime Museum, San Francisco Maritime National Historical Park, California, USA
 Museo Naval México, Veracruz, Mexico
 Mystic Seaport, Mystic, Connecticut, USA
 National Museum of Naval Aviation, Pensacola, Florida, USA
 National Museum of the United States Navy, Washington, D.C., USA
 Nauticus, Norfolk, Virginia, USA
 Naval Undersea Museum, Keyport, Washington, USA
 Naval War College Museum, Newport, Rhode Island, USA
 New Bedford Whaling Museum, New Bedford, Massachusetts, USA
 PT Boat Museum, Fall River, Massachusetts, USA
 Salem Maritime National Historic Site, Salem, Massachusetts, USA
 Santa Barbara Maritime Museum, Santa Barbara, California, USA
 Site historique maritime de la Pointe-au-Père, Rimouski, Quebec, Canada
 South Street Seaport, New York City, USA
 Tahoe Maritime Museum, Homewood, California, USA
 Tuckerton Seaport, Tuckerton, New Jersey, USA
 United States Naval Academy Museum, Annapolis, Maryland, USA
 U.S. Navy Submarine Force Library and Museum, Groton, Connecticut, USA
 USS Constitution Museum, Boston, Massachusetts, USA
 Vancouver Maritime Museum, Vancouver British Columbia, Canada
 Wisconsin Maritime Museum, Manitowoc, Wisconsin, USA
 National Museum of the Great Lakes, Toledo, Ohio, USA
 Great Lakes Shipwreck Museum, Whitefish Point Light, Michigan, USA
 Ships of the Sea Maritime Museum, Savannah, Georgia, USA

South America 
 Mar del Plata Museum of the Sea, Mar del Plata, Argentina
 Museo Nao Victoria, Punta Arenas, Chile
 Museu Nacional do Mar, São Francisco do Sul, Brazil
 Museu Náutico, Rio Grande, Brazil
 Museu Naval, Rio de Janeiro, Brazil
 Museum of the Sea, Bogotá, Colombia
 Museum of the Sea, La Barra, Uruguay
 Naval Museum of Montevideo, Montevideo, Uruguay
 Naval Museum of Peru, Callao, Peru

See also 
 List of maritime museums in the United States
 List of museum ships
 List of former museum ships
 Museum ship
 National Maritime Museums
 Ship replica
 Ships preserved in museums

References 

 Aymar, B. (1967). A pictorial treasury of the marine museums of the world; A guide to the maritime collections, restorations, replicas, and marine museums in twenty-three countries. New York: Crown.
 Burton, A. (2003). The Daily Telegraph Guide to Britain's Maritime Past. London: Aurum Press.
 Evans, M. H., & West, J. (1998). Maritime museums: A guide to the collections and museum ships in Britain and Ireland. London: Chatham Pub.
 Heiney, P. (2005). Maritime Britain. London: Adlard Coles Nautical.
 Neill, P., & Krohn, B. E. (1991). Great maritime museums of the world. New York: Balsam Press in association with H.N. Abrams.
 Smith, R. H. (2006). Smith's guide to maritime museums of North America. Del Mar, CA: C Books.
 Stammers, M. (1978). Discovering maritime museums and historic ships. Discovering series, no. 228. Aylesbury [England]: Shire Publications
 Stanford, J. M. (1990). Sea history's guide to American and Canadian maritime museums. Croton-on-Hudson: Sea History Press.
 Sullivan, D. (1978). Old ships, boats & maritime museums. London: Coracle Books.

External links 
 International Congress of Maritime Museums website
 Nauticus Norfolk, VA
 Maritime and Naval Museums in Britain and Ireland
 USA museum list
 Non-USA museum list
 Maritime Museums worldwide
 Maritime Museums in Europe

 
Types of museums
Maritime history organizations